Sree Chinakkathoor Bhagavathy Temple is located in Palappuram and about 5 km from Ottappalam, Palakkad, north Kerala. The temple is in the middle of a huge ground where the Chinakkathoor pooram is conducted every year. 

There are two shrines are Thazhekavu (lower shrine) and Melakavu (upper shrine). Melakavu is believed to be older than Thazekavu. The priests of the upper shrine traditionally come from the Kulangara nair family of Palappuram. Namboothiri priests do the pujas in the lower shrine and in the ten days of Pooram. They are in charge of the upper shrine as well. There is a shrine dedicated to Lord Vigneshwara (Ganapati) who is believed to be in his divine "Vidya Ganapati" form, adjoining the temple complex near the iconic banyan tree (ficus religiosa).

Chinakkathoor Pooram

Chinakkathoor Festival is celebrated every year in February-March (makam naal of kumbham).

The highlight of the evening festivities is a procession of 28 tuskers. Traditional performances of the Panchavadyam or the temple orchestra and various other art forms like Vellattu, Theyyam, Poothanum thirayum, Kaalavela, Kuthiravela, Aandi Vedan, Karivela, and so on are shown. The Tholppavakkoothu, a ritualistic shadow puppet show, is performed at the temple premises every evening for the 17 days preceding the concluding festival. The festival starts with kuthira kali(horse) game and ends next day with Theru (Ratham), a decoration by Mudaliar tamils of Palappuram, and the procession of 16 models of the kuthira (horse) and the kaala (bull) brought ceremoniously to the temple by devotees. Unlike other Ratham in Tamil Nadu or Kalpathy, this is not pulled by Vatam (coir) and runs on wooden wheel.

Getting there
Nearest railway station: Ottappalam, about 5 km from the shrine

Nearest airport: Coimbatore in neighbouring state of Tamil Nadu, about 85 km

See also
 Temples of Kerala

Ottapalam
Hindu temples in Palakkad district
Bhagavathi temples in Kerala